TMA-3 may be:
 TMA-3 mine
 Soyuz TMA-3, a Russian space exploration mission
 2,3,4-Trimethoxyamphetamine, a hallucinogenic drug